Claude Viens (born April 29, 1949) was a former Canadian handball player who competed in the 1976 Summer Olympics.

Born in Saint-Jean-sur-Richelieu, Quebec, Viens was part of the Canadian handball team which finished eleventh in the 1976 Olympic tournament. He played all five matches and scored 13 goals.

References
 Profile

1949 births
Canadian male handball players
French Quebecers
Handball players at the 1976 Summer Olympics
Living people
Olympic handball players of Canada
People from Saint-Jean-sur-Richelieu
Sportspeople from Quebec